The Diyarbakır Stadium is a stadium in Diyarbakır, Turkey. It was opened in 2018 and has a capacity of 33,000 spectators. It is the new home of Diyarbakırspor and Amed S.F.K.

References

Football venues in Turkey
Sports venues completed in 2018
Sport in Diyarbakır
2018 establishments in Turkey